The African Kingdoms LUMI is a currency with limited recognition. It was established as legal tender within the 2014 Bank Act of Accompong, a village in Jamaica, and issued to the public by the  Central Solar Reserve Bank of Accompong as the currency of the Sovereign Maroon State of Accompong with its physical bank notes printed in Canada. The LUMI was created by the then Minister of Finance and Founding Governor of the Bank of Accompong, H.H. Chief Timothy McPherson, who is a global financial engineer that hails from the Maroon territory of Queen Nanny of the Maroons on the Island of Jamaica.

Although the first AKL Lumi were printed in 2016 for use within Accompong, proponents of the currency claim that since 2020 the LUMI has been adopted as the official currency by governmental bodies, including: the self-proclaimed Economic Community of the States, Nations, Territories and Realms of the African Diaspora 6th Region (ECO-6), the State of the African Diaspora, the African Kingdoms Federation, the United Kingdoms of Africa, and the African Diaspora Central Bank. However the Bank of Jamaica warned against the currency, stating "Any purported issuance of currency of the island of Jamaica by a person or an entity other than the Bank of Jamaica is unauthorised and in breach of the Bank of Jamaica Act”

Underwritten by solar energy through power purchase agreements, the currency is worth 100Kwh of solar energy, with a fixed valuation at 4 grains of gold (0.2592 grams) for 1 AKL.
The lumi is no longer used as the Accompong currency. It is now issued by the African Diaspora Central Bank since the Central Solar Reserve Bank was destituted by Colonel Richard Currie when he replaced Colonel Ferron Williams as the new elected Head of State for Accompong.

See also 

 Central banks and currencies of the Caribbean
 Commonwealth banknote-issuing institutions
 African Monetary Union
 African Central Bank
 Economic integration of West African States
 Economic Community of Central African States
 Central African CFA franc (CAF)
 East African shilling
 Council of Arab Economic Unity (CAEU)
 Arab Maghreb Union
 List of Commonwealth of Nations countries by GDP

Notes 
There currently is only 1 banknote, which represents 1 lumi.
In 2021, the African Diaspora Central Bank (ADCB) claimed a total of US$1.1 trillion in transactions between Africa and the global Diaspora using LUMI; this would be equal to more than a third of the total GDP for continental Africa at US$2.7 trillion in 2021.

References 

Currencies of Africa